The Syracuse University College of Arts and Sciences (A&S) is the founding liberal arts college of Syracuse University in Syracuse, New York. Established in 1871, it is the oldest and largest college at Syracuse University by enrollment. It offers programs in the natural sciences, mathematics, and the humanities, as well as the social sciences in collaboration with the Maxwell School of Citizenship and Public Affairs.

History 

The College of Arts and Sciences was founded in 1871 as the College of Liberal Arts and offered courses in algebra, geometry, Latin, Greek, history, physiology, education, and rhetoric. John Raymond French, a professor of mathematics, served as the first dean of the college. 

Prior to the completion of Hall of Languages in 1873, classes were held in a rental property in downtown Syracuse. The college's curriculum steadily expanded over the years, such as the establishment of biology and geology department in 1891, the predecessor of today's department of biology and department of earth and environmental sciences. Construction of the Physics Building, which was partially funded by a $1.58 million National Science Foundation grant, was completed in 1967 to house the growing physics department. 

The College of Liberal Arts was renamed the College of Arts and Sciences in 1970 to reflect the breadth of its curriculum.

In 2008, the University’s largest academic construction project — the $107 million, 200,000-square-foot Life Sciences Complex — was completed and, for the first time, combined the departments of biology and chemistry under the same roof.

Karin Ruhlandt, chair of the department of chemistry, was named dean of the College of Arts and Sciences in January 2015. Having served more than 7 years as dean, she stepped down in June 2022. Lois Agnew, associate dean of curriculum, innovation and pedagogy, was named interim dean while a national search for Ruhlandt’s permanent replacement commenced.

Academics 
The College of Arts and Sciences is a selective liberal arts college. It is home to research centers and institutes such as the Syracuse University Humanities Center, the BioInspired Institute, and the Forensic and National Security Sciences Institute (FNSSI). It offers over 50 bachelor's, master's, and doctoral degree programs in the natural sciences, mathematics, and the humanities, as well as the social sciences in collaboration with the Maxwell School of Citizenship and Public Affairs.

Academic departments 
The college is organized into the following major academic departments in the natural sciences, mathematics, and the humanities. Departments in the social sciences are housed within the Maxwell School of Citizenship and Public Affairs.

African American Studies
Art and Music Histories
Biology
Biotechnology
Chemistry
Communication Sciences and Disorders
Earth and Environmental Sciences
English
Languages, Literatures, and Linguistics
Mathematics
Neuroscience
Philosophy
Physics
Psychology
Religion
Science Teaching
Women's and Gender Studies
Writing Studies, Rhetoric, and Composition

Majors & Minors 
The following are majors and minors offered at the college.
African American Studies
Anthropology
Arabic
Art and Music Histories
Asian/Asian American Studies
Biology
Biotechnology
Chemistry
Chinese
Citizenship and Civic Engagement

Classics and Classical Civilization
Communication Sciences and Disorders
Digital Humanities
Earth and Environmental Sciences
Economics
Energy and Its Impacts
English
Environment, Sustainability, and Policy
Forensic Science
French

Geography and the Environment
German
Health Humanities
History
International Relations
Italian
Japanese
Jewish Studies
Latino-Latin American Studies
Lesbian, Gay, Bisexual, Transgender, and Queer (LGBTQ) Studies

Linguistics
Mathematics
Medieval and Renaissance Studies
Middle Eastern Studies
Modern Foreign Languages
Native American and Indigenous Studies
Neuroscience
Philosophy
Physics
Policy Studies

Political Science
Psychology
Religion
Russian
Science Teaching
Selected Studies
Sociology
South Asian Studies
Spanish
Statistics

Women's and Gender Studies
Writing Studies, Rhetoric, and Composition

References

External links 

A&S
1871 establishments in New York (state)
Educational institutions established in 1871
Liberal arts colleges at universities in the United States